Nesler is a surname. Notable people with the surname include:

 Ellie Nesler (1952–2008), American criminal
 Mark Nesler (born 1961), American country music artist

See also
 Nessler